The Celtic Warriors were a rugby union team from Wales, who played in the 2003–04 Celtic League and the 2003–04 Heineken Cup following the introduction of regional rugby union teams in Wales. They were effectively a temporary merger of Pontypridd RFC and Bridgend RFC.  
The Celtic Warriors played just one season before disbanding.

History

The Warriors were one of the five original regions of the Welsh Regional Rugby Era. The club came into being in the summer of 2003 when the Welsh Rugby Union controversially elected to reduce the current top tier of Welsh Professional Rugby from nine clubs into five regions, attempting to mirror the successful formats of rugby union in Ireland, South Africa, Australia and New Zealand. Officially representing the mid-Glamorgan area, including Merthyr Tydfil, Aberdare, Pontypridd, Caerphilly, Maesteg and Bridgend, and south Powys, the Celtic Warriors was in practice a combination of two Welsh Premier Division clubs, Pontypridd RFC and Bridgend RFC . With Bridgend RFC having clinched the 2002–03 Welsh Premier League title and Pontypridd RFC being consistently strong in those competitions, the Warriors were considered one of the strongest line-ups of the five Welsh regions.

However, problems dogged the region from the very start, as they similarly did with the other merged regions of the Neath-Swansea Ospreys and the Newport Gwent Dragons. Discussions and arguments abounded about the team name, colours and home grounds for most of the summer of 2003. The name "Valley Ravens" was a controversial choice but seen by many as a fair compromise (Bridgend's nickname was the Ravens while Pontypridd fans welcomed the Valley reference), however various marketing persons within the Welsh Rugby Union did not like it. "The Crusaders" and "Celtic Crusaders" met with widespread disapproval from both sets of fans as it incorporated neither team's identity. "Celtic Warriors" was finally decided upon more out of the need for a name than from any real agreement.

Argument over team colours ran alongside the naming problem until a compromise blue, black and white shirt was unveiled and satisfied most people, as did the initial decision to play an equal number of games at Bridgend's Brewery Field and Pontypridd's Sardis Road.

The team itself performed well for a squad almost completely rebuilt over the summer, acquitting themselves well in both the 2003–04 Celtic League and the 2003–04 Heineken Cup. However financial problems at Pontypridd RFC led to the sale of their half of the Warriors to Bridgend RFC owner Leighton Samuel, which he in turn gave to the WRU, a move that would later condemn the club. Further problems occurred as Samuel made the decision to abandon Pontypridd's Sardis Road in favour of playing all Warriors games in Bridgend. This brought the club into conflict with a large proportion of its fan base and attendances fell.

Trouble followed in the Spring and early Summer of 2004 where Leighton Samuel repeatedly threatened and revoked threats of selling the club; one such instance went as far as Samuel accepting an offer from the WRU before changing his mind. This transaction was considered to be legally binding, and the Warriors became 100% owned by the WRU who decided to liquidate the club on 1 June 2004.

Samuels claimed that the WRU had promised to keep the region going for a second season but reneged on the deal. He challenged the Union over this in a high court case which the Union settled just before it came to court.

Aftermath

With the demise of the club, players' contracts were effectively torn up as they were pushed around to fill positions in the other four regional sides. A number simply chose to turn their back on the Welsh game and moved to teams in England and France. This left the ex-Warriors' fans feeling alienated from the professional game.

In the aftermath of the demise of the Warriors, a new rugby league club Celtic Crusaders was formed and played at Brewery Field. They were funded by Leighton Samuel, who claimed that they were the reincarnation of the Warriors franchise. The club lasted four seasons in Bridgend before relocating to Wrexham under new ownership.

Home ground
The "Warriors" used both Brewery Field and Sardis Road for their home games.

Statistics

Celtic League

Celtic Cup

Heineken Cup

Squad

 Arwel Thomas and Caleb Ralph both agreed terms to join the Celtic Warriors for the 2004–05 season, as the region was disbanded before their contracts began, neither player represented the region.

British & Irish Lions

See also
Pro14
Crusaders Rugby League
Celtic League
Heineken Cup
European Rugby Shield

External links
Bridgend RFC  official site
Pontypridd RFC official site

Footnotes

 
United Rugby Championship teams
Defunct Welsh rugby union teams
2003–04 Celtic League
2003–04 Heineken Cup
Rugby clubs established in 2003
Sports clubs disestablished in 2004